Tellina radiata, common name sunrise tellin, is a species of bivalve mollusc in the family Tellinidae, the tellins.

Description
The shells of these bivalves are yellowish-white or pale pinkish, with a smooth and shiny surface. They show a quite variable pattern of pinkish-brown bands radiating from the top to the edges. These bivalves live buried in sand.

Distribution and habitat
The sunrise tellin can be found in the Eastern North America (Caribbean Sea, Colombia, Cuba, Gulf of Mexico, Jamaica...as far South-East as Barbados). These filter-feeding bivalves inhabit marine and estuarine settings.

References

Tellinidae
Molluscs described in 1758
Taxa named by Carl Linnaeus